Lobiani is a traditional Georgian dish of bean-filled bread. In Georgia the most popular is Rachuli Lobiani (რაჭული ლობიანი), like a Khachapuri, but with beans.

The word Lobiani comes from the Georgian word for beans which is ლობიო (Lobio). This Lobio, or the kidney beans, is the most important ingredient for making Lobiani.

The dough for lobiani is made using matsoni. Pre-boiled beans are used for the filling.

See also 
Lobio
Matsoni
Khachapuri

References

Cuisine of Georgia (country)
Caucasian cuisine
Legume dishes
Pies